The Great Midwest Athletic Conference (G-MAC) men's basketball tournament is the annual conference basketball championship tournament for the Great Midwest Athletic Conference. The tournament has been held annually since 2013. It is a single-elimination tournament and seeding is based on regular season records.

The winner, declared conference champion, receives the conference's automatic bid to the NCAA Men's Division II Basketball Championship.

Results

Championship records

 Lake Erie, Northwood, and Tiffin have yet to advance to a tournament final.
Davis & Elkins, Urbana, UVA Wise, Central State, Ohio Valley, and Salem International never qualified for the tournament finals as G-MAC members.
 Schools highlighted in pink are former G-MAC members.

See also
 Great Midwest Athletic Conference women's basketball tournament

References

NCAA Division II men's basketball conference tournaments
Basketball Tournament, Men's
Recurring sporting events established in 2013